The American Beauty/American Psycho Tour was a concert tour by American rock band Fall Out Boy. Supporting the band's sixth studio album American Beauty/American Psycho (2015), the tour visited North America and Europe in 2015. The North American leg was co-headlined with American rapper Wiz Khalifa under the name The Boys of Zummer. The Boys of Zummer leg with Wiz Khalifa ranked fifty-ninth for Pollstar's Year End Top 200 North American Tours of 2015, grossing $18.2 million.

Background and development
In 2013, the band released their fifth album Save Rock and Roll. To support the record, the band toured between 2013 and 2014, during the Save Rock and Roll Tour and the Monumentour with Paramore. In late 2014 during Momunentour, the band started working on the new album, which was almost finished around November and was released in January 2015.

The band played two small venue release shows in January 2015, in London and Chicago. In February and March, they played four full-length sets at the Australian music festival Soundwave for the first time, with additional headlining sideshows in Sydney and Brisbane. They also performed at the Soundwave spin-off Westfest in New Zealand. Next was a headlining performance in a stadium at RodeoHouston on March 8. They are on the bill for the Pot of Gold festival in Tempe and are headlining three Punkspring festival dates with Rancid in Japan in late March 2015. On January 14, 2015, a 7-date October UK tour was announced and shortly expanded to 8 dates. On January 15, a co-headlining 39-date Boys of Zummer tour with rapper Wiz Khalifa was announced for a North America leg from June to August. A nine date European tour was announced to visit six countries in October 2015. Fall Out Boy headlined SunFest on May 3.

Set list 

 "Sugar, We're Goin Down"
 "Irresistible"
 "The Phoenix"
 "A Little Less Sixteen Candles, a Little More "Touch Me""
 "I Slept With Someone in Fall Out Boy and All I Got Was This Stupid Song Written About Me"
 "Thriller"
 "The Kids Aren't Alright"
 "This Ain't a Scene, It's an Arms Race"
 "Immortals"
 "Young Volcanoes"
 "Dance, Dance"
 "American Beauty/American Psycho"
 "Jet Pack Blues"
 "Grand Theft Autumn/Where Is Your Boy"
 "Uma Thurman"
 "Thnks Fr Th Mmrs"
 "I Don't Care"
 "Centuries"
Encore
 "My Songs Know What You Did in the Dark (Light Em Up)"
 "Saturday"

Opening acts
Wiz Khalifa 
Hoodie Allen 
Professor Green (Europe) (select dates)
Matt and Kim (Europe) (select dates)

Tour dates

Notes

References

2015 concert tours
Co-headlining concert tours
Fall Out Boy